Pobre niña rica (English title: Poor Little Rich Girl) is a Mexican telenovela produced by Enrique Segoviano for Televisa.

The series stars Victoria Ruffo as Consuelo, Ariel López Padilla as Julio and Paulina Rubio as Alma.

Plot 
Like the story of Cinderella, Consuelo has been reduced to being practically a servant by her mother and her two brothers. The only one who loves her is her father, but he soon dies. And when her family finds out that he left everything to her, they send her abroad so that she will not find out and they can keep the money. But the fairy godmother and the prince both appear in the guise of Julio, a neurologist who sees beyond Consuelo's unattractive appearance to the beautiful woman who lies underneath. He will give her his love but, more importantly, he will teach her to love herself.

Cast

Main 
 Victoria Ruffo as Consuelo
 Ariel López Padilla as Julio
 Paulina Rubio as Alma

Supporting & Recurring 
 Laura Zapata as Teresa
 Gerardo Murguía as Carlos Villagrán
 Miguel Córcega as Don Juan Carlos Villagrán
 Antonio as César Manzanillo
 Amparo Arozamena as Doña Andrea Múzquiz
 Marco Antonio Calvillo as Hijo de Cata
 Elsa Cárdenas as  Alicia de García-Mora 
 Gerardo del Castillo as Teniente J.
 Pilar Escalante as Claudia Domínguez
 Ernesto Godoy as Mauricio Villagrán García-Mora
 Gabriela Platas as Estela Medrano
 Luis Uribe as Héctor Iturriaga
 Rafael Amador as Chavo
 Alejandro Aragón as Alfredo
 Sergio Catalán as Eduardo
 Aurora Clavel as Cata
 Mauricio Islas as David
 Mercedes Molto as Bárbara
 Azela Robinson as Ana Luisa 
 Indra Zuno as Ángela

References

External links

1995 telenovelas
Mexican telenovelas
1995 Mexican television series debuts
1996 Mexican television series endings
Mexican television series based on Venezuelan television series
Spanish-language telenovelas
Television shows set in Mexico
Televisa telenovelas